WCTT can refer to:

 Wimbledon Common Time Trial
 WCTT-FM, a radio station at 107.3 FM located in Corbin, Kentucky
 WCTT (AM), a radio station at 680 AM located in Corbin, Kentucky